I Am Cait is an American television documentary series which chronicles the life of Caitlyn Jenner after her gender transition. The eight-part one-hour documentary series debuted on July 26, 2015, on the E! network.  The series focuses on the "new normal" for Jenner, exploring changes to her relationships with her family and friends. The show additionally explores how Jenner adjusts to what she sees as her job as a role model for the transgender community.

In its first season, critical reception of I Am Cait was generally positive. Critics particularly praised the series' approach to the social issues of the transgender community and its influence on the way Americans see and understand transgender people in general. The show's informative and serious tone was also noted, and how it differed from Keeping Up with the Kardashians, a reality series that Jenner has starred in together with her family. In October, the show was renewed for a second season, which premiered on March 6, 2016.

On August 16, 2016, E! cancelled the series after two seasons, due to low ratings.

Production 
The network announced the documentary series on April 24, 2015, immediately after Caitlyn Jenner came out as a trans woman during a 20/20 interview with Diane Sawyer. "Bruce is incredibly courageous and an inspiration, and we are proud to be entrusted with this deeply personal and important story," said Jeff Olde, Head of Programming of E! network. "This series will present an unfiltered look as Bruce boldly steps into uncharted territory and is true to himself for the first time," Olde also added. The series has selected a renowned group of consultants, including Jennifer Finney Boylan, Dr. Marie Keller and Susan P. Landon, who will work on the show to keep it insightful, as well as enlisted support from GLAAD, an LGBTQ-focused media advocacy organization. The first trailer for the series, now titled I Am Cait, was released on June 3, 2015, after Jenner introduced herself as Caitlyn in the interview with Vanity Fair.

The idea of the reality television series which would document the gender transition of Caitlyn Jenner was initially introduced about a year before the show was announced to the public. Jeff Jenkins, one of the producers on Keeping Up With the Kardashians, got a call about a meeting with Jenner, thus confirming the rumors of her transition. The series was confirmed several months later once Jenner got the right idea about the purpose of the series. "She would have been so hounded for the story and that's why, in my understanding, she decided, ... so [she could] hopefully tell all of it in the right way," Jenkins speculated the reasons why Jenner accepted the series. "Why did I decide to do a series? I am telling my story ... This is about getting to be who you really are," Jenner later herself explained the reasons for opening her life on television in one of the promotional videos.

Several days later after the interview with Diane Sawyer, E! aired a two-part episode special on Keeping Up with the Kardashians entitled About Bruce, in which another side of the story was told featuring family members who did not appear in the previous interview on 20/20. Dee Lockett, writing for Vulture, speculated that the interviews were "strategically set up Caitlyn's transition to become the show's next must-watch spectacle, [I Am Cait]". Caitlyn Jenner has been appearing on the family's reality show since its introduction and was considered as a sidelined character. Lockett also noted that the special "was a test-run, for both Caitlyn and E!, to see how their fan-favorite reality series would look with one of its most underappreciated characters (and last names) running the show."

The show premiered on E!, the same network which serves as the home to Keeping Up with the Kardashians, a reality television series that Jenner has starred in together with her family since 2007. I Am Cait is produced by Bunim/Murray Productions, the same company that created Keeping Up With the Kardashians, with Gil Goldschein, Jeff Jenkins, Farnaz Farjam, Andrea Metz and Melissa Bidwell as well as Jenner herself acting as executive producers. A private screening of the premiere was held by Jenner a week prior to its official airing, while the first episode of I Am Cait was shown to critics in Manhattan two days later. The docu-series was released amidst a wave of new programming related to transgender issues, including TLC's reality show I Am Jazz and ABC Family's Becoming Us.

In October 2015, the network announced that the reality series will return for a second season. "Caitlyn's story has ignited a global conversation on the transgender community on a scale that has never been seen before," said Jeff Olde, an executive vice president of E!. "We are honored Caitlyn has chosen to continue to share her ongoing story with our viewers around the world", Olde also added. Season 2 premiered on March 6, 2016.

Supporting cast
The show includes a number of transgender people who have become part of Jenner's inner circle, featured throughout the show with their own sub-plots and to offer information on the transgender community. Jennifer Finney Boylan, Candis Cayne, Sophia Hutchins, Chandi Moore, Zackary Drucker and Kate Bornstein have all appeared since the show's inception. Jen Richards was a member of the supporting cast but left after Season 1. Jenner's hair stylist Courtney Nanson has also appeared since season 1. Jenner's best friend and personal assistant Ronda Kamihira appeared in Season 1 only. Since Season 2, an 18-year-old member of the transgender community named Ella Giselle has appeared.

Episodes

Season 1 (2015)

Season 2 (2016)

Reception

Critical response 

The first episode of I Am Cait has been met with generally positive reviews from television critics, who were given an advance screening of the series premiere. At Metacritic, which assigns a weighted mean rating out of 100 to reviews from mainstream critics, the docuseries received an average score of 67, based on seventeen reviews. Brian Lowry from Variety magazine appreciated the show's goal by saying that "tension is very much on display in the premiere, which obviously seeks a more elevated plane – keenly aware of Jenner's platform to educate and assist vulnerable youths – while clinging to familiar reality-TV conventions."

Frank Scheck, a critic from The Hollywood Reporter, also emphasized the show's approach to addressing transgender issues, writing, "clearly striving to impart serious messages about tolerance of the transgender community while throwing in a few Kardashians for comic relief, I Am Cait emerges as a surprisingly thoughtful if undeniably self-serving effort." He also worried whether the show would be capable to "continue its delicate balancing act of depicting the many challenges attendant to Jenner's new identity while presenting the sensationalistic comic material which reality viewers crave."  Jane Mulkerrins of The Telegraph called the show "noble" and appreciated the show's approach to the issues, and also noted that the show contains "plenty of levity" as well.

Tom Gliatto from People magazine said that the show "is closer in tone to a reality show on Oprah Winfrey's OWN than E!" Verne Gay, writing for Newsday, called the show "the most anticipated docuseries" in E!'s history and noted its different approach by adding that what "viewers will ... see Sunday is something entirely new -- also bracing, emotional and even touching." Sandra Gonzalez of Mashable applauded the series and said that "the show also makes a point of spotlighting stories that don't end when the TV is switched off or the magazines are no longer on the stands." She also added that "with moments both stark and silly, the series has exactly what it needs to exist on a network where entertainment and empathy don't always go hand-in-hand." Michael Idato from The Sydney Morning Herald described the series as "uncomfortably, beautifully, brutally honest." Don Kaplan of the New York Daily News said the show "is touching, funny and smart as it tracks the immediate aftermath of Jenner's much-publicized shift from a man who spent the last 40 years as one of the world's most masculine athletes to a woman deeply concerned about how this new lifestyle will affect her immediate family."

Mike Hale of The New York Times wrote a less enthusiastic review, stating that the "glossy" series lacked conflict. Hale wrote that I Am Cait "accomplishes its inspirational, educational and motivational goals ... It doesn't totally succeed as dramatic reality television, but perhaps that's to be expected given how high the stakes are, both for the transgender cause and for Ms. Jenner's personal brand." Hale also compared I Am Cait with the other two new reality series about transgender people, writing that I Am Jazz and Becoming Us "... are more able to generate some tension and discord, perhaps because they focus on younger people and take place outside the celebrity bubble of affirmation." Michelle Ruiz from Vogue magazine noted how important the show is for the American people, who still struggle to understand transgender people. "But if it makes it a little harder for someone who has never met a transgender person to reduce them to an abstract idea instead of a human being, it's a start," the critic added.

Ratings 
The initial airing of the show's premiere averaged a 1.2 rating in adults 18-49 and 2.73 million viewers overall. The Australian premiere on E! Australia was the ninth most watched program on subscription television rating 59,000 viewers.

Awards 
The show tied for best Outstanding Reality Program at the 27th GLAAD Media Awards in April 2016.

Broadcast history 

The documentary series premiered in the United States and Canada at 8:00 PM ET on July 26, 2015, on E! cable network. In Australia, the series debuted on the local version of E! on July 27, and in the United Kingdom beginning on August 2, 2015. Additionally, the series is broadcast worldwide on local E! channels in 123 countries and has been translated into 24 languages.

Home media 
On November 26, 2015, the first season was released on DVD in Australia. The second season was released on July 7, 2016.

See also 

 The Secrets of My Life
 Becoming Us
 I Am Jazz
 Media portrayals of transgender people

References

External links 
 
 
 

2015 American television series debuts
2016 American television series endings
2010s American LGBT-related television series
American LGBT-related reality television series
American television spin-offs
Jenner family
Kylie Jenner
Kendall Jenner
E! original programming
English-language television shows
Keeping Up with the Kardashians
LGBT culture in Los Angeles
Reality television spin-offs
Television series by Bunim/Murray Productions
Television shows set in Los Angeles
Transgender in the United States
Transgender-related television shows
2010s LGBT-related reality television series